Lapham's Quarterly is a literary magazine established in 2007 by former Harper's Magazine editor Lewis H. Lapham. Each issue examines a theme using primary source material from history. The inaugural issue "States of War" contained dozens of essays, speeches, and excerpts from historical authors ranging from Thucydides, William Shakespeare, and Sun Tzu to Mark Twain, among others. Recent issue themes included "Foreigners", "Time", and "Youth". Each issue includes an introductory essay by Lapham (or a member of the magazine's editorial board), readings from historical contributors, and essays by contemporary writers and historians.

History
Lapham left Harper's in 2006 to found Lapham's Quarterly, saying he had been thinking about the idea since 1998:"I had put together a collection of texts on the end of the world for the History Book Club. They wanted something at the turn of the millennium and I developed this idea by looking at the way the end of the world has ended [or been envisioned to end] many, many times and how predictions of doom have been spread across time. Whether you're talking about the Book of Revelation or tenth-century sects. So I had this wonderful collection of texts and I thought what a great idea. Also it was fun."

Organization
Lapham's Quarterly is published by the American Agora Foundation, a not-for-profit foundation dedicated to fostering interest in history. The offices are located in New York City. As of 2014, the magazine had a staff of 17 and a circulation of 40,000.

Online
Since 2010 the magazine has produced a podcast featuring interviews and discussion related to topics from recent issues.

References

Further reading 
 .
 .
"F. Scott Fitzgerald, It Seems, Never Met Lewis Lapham", by Gary Shapiro, New York Sun, February 23, 2007.
"Lapham's Quarterly: Cutting-Edge Journalism From The Distant Past", Tony Hendra, Huffington Post, Dec 3, 2007.
"My Library: Lewis Lapham", a look inside the journal’s operations.

External links 
 

Visual arts magazines published in the United States
Literary magazines published in the United States
Political magazines published in the United States
Quarterly magazines published in the United States
Magazines established in 2007
Magazines published in New York City
Publishing companies of the United States